The World Rugby Pacific Challenge, formerly the IRB Pacific Rugby Cup, is an annual rugby union football tournament held in Oceania since 2006. It is contested by national 'A' teams (formed from the best locally based players, with most not already on their nations' senior rugby team) from the Asia-Pacific region. The tournament is run by World Rugby (previously IRB) through Oceania Rugby.

The original IRB Pacific Rugby Cup featured two teams from each of the three Pacific Island countries of Fiji, Samoa and Tonga. The competition followed the completion of Fiji's Colonial Cup, Samoa's National Provincial Championship and Tonga's Provincial Championship and provided player development pathway leading into the IRB Pacific Nations Cup.

Since 2011, the tournament has been contested by national 'A' sides, although some matches also featured teams from Super Rugby academies in Australia and New Zealand. Teams from Japan, Argentina and Canada have also joined the tournament to compete with the three Pacific Island countries.

Teams
The competing national 'A' teams as of the 2018 season  were:
 Fiji Warriors

Overall
Summary of all Pacific Challenge winners and runners-up, for tournaments up to and including 2020:

By team

By country

History

Pacific Island tournament: 2006 to 2010 

The Pacific Rugby Cup initially featured six representative teams, two from each Pacific Island country:

{|style= "table-layout:fixed; width=95%; margin-top:0;margin-left:0; border-width:1px;border-style:none ;border-color:#ddd; padding:0px; vertical-align:top;"
|-
| valign=top | 
|
|-
| valign=top | 
|
|-
| valign=top | 
|
|}

The format was a single round-robin tournament with the top-placed team hosting a final against the second-placed to decide the title. The Fiji Warriors won the competition twice, the Samoan teams won the Cup once each, and Tautahi Gold also claimed the title once for Tonga.

Pacific Australasian series: 2011 to 2014 
From 2011, the three Pacific Island countries were represented by their national 'A' teams. They were joined by Japan's national 'A' team, Junior Japan, as the fourth core team in 2013. The itinerary included tour matches against Super Rugby academy opposition from Australia and New Zealand and included the following sides:

{|style= "table-layout:fixed; width=95%; margin-top:0;margin-left:0; border-width:1px;border-style:none ;border-color:#ddd; padding:0px; vertical-align:top;"
|-
| valign=top | 
|
|-
| valign=top | 
|
|-
| valign=top | 
|
|}
The tournament was split into three stages with the core Pacific Cup teams playing Super Rugby academies in the first two stages in Australia and New Zealand, respectively. In the third stage, the Pacific Cup teams played each other in a single round robin, home or away, to decide the title. No finals were played and the team finishing on top of the combined table after all stages was the tournament winner. The Fiji Warriors won all three tournaments from 2011 to 2013.

The format was expanded again in 2014 with Argentina's Pampas XV and four Australian academy teams joining the competition as core teams competing with the Pacific A sides. The New Zealand development teams did not participate in 2014 and the tournament was held entirely in Australia. Two pools were formed as follows:

{|style= "table-layout:fixed; width=95%; margin-top:0;margin-left:0; border-width:1px;border-style:none ;border-color:#ddd; padding:0px; vertical-align:top;"
|-
| valign=top | 
|
|-
| valign=top | 
|
|}

A single round robin was played in each pool with the top ranked sides from each playing in the final. The Pampas XV defeated Reds A in the final held in Sydney to win the title. Fiji Warriors defeated Samoa A in the play-off for third place.

Pacific Challenge: 2015 onward
The Pacific Rugby Cup was restyled as the "Pacific Challenge" in 2015 and held in Fiji. It returned to a being a tournament solely for national 'A' teams, with  replacing the Australian academy teams. Pampas XV won in 2015.

Notes
 Japan A, Force A, Rebel Rising, and the Brisbane and Sydney Academies joined in 2013.
 The Blues and Highlanders development teams featured in 2012 and 2013.
 The Pacific stage was cancelled in 2013 to allow Fiji, Samoa and Tonga to maximise preparations for the end-of-year tours.

Winners

Tournaments
Teams listed are those that qualified for the Pacific Rugby Cup final matches (for seasons without a final, the core teams are shown). Results of the final matches are written so that the score of the team in each row is mentioned first.

Pacific Challenge: 2015 onward
Contested by the national 'A' teams of Fiji, Japan, Samoa, and Tonga. Canada A along with Argentina's Pampas XV also competed in 2015.

{| class="wikitable" style="text-align:center;"
|+  Pacific Rugby Challenge winner and runner-up
!rowspan=2|Year
!rowspan=2 style="padding:0 0.75em"|Duration
!rowspan=2|Pos
!rowspan=2 style="padding:0 3.1em"|Team
!colspan=10|Pool matches
!colspan=1|Play-offs
!rowspan=2|Refs
|-
! style="width:20px;"|Pld
! style="width:20px;"|W
! style="width:20px;"|D
! style="width:20px;"|L
! style="width:20px;"|F
! style="width:20px;"|A
! style="width:25px;"|Diff
! style="width:20px;"|TB
! style="width:20px;"|LB
! style="width:20px;"|Pts
! style="padding:0 1em"| Final
|-
|- 
|rowspan=2| 2020
|rowspan=2| 6 Marchto14 March
| 1
|align=left bgcolor="#d0ffd0"|Junior Japan
| 3|| 3||0 ||0 ||143||25||+118||2 ||0 ||14
| –
|rowspan=2|
|-
| 2
|align=left|Fiji Warriors
| 3 ||2 ||0 ||1 || 88 ||26|| +62 ||2 ||0 ||10
| –
|- 
|rowspan=2| 2019
|rowspan=2| 8 Marchto16 March
| 1
|align=left bgcolor="#d0ffd0"|Fiji Warriors
| 3 ||3 ||0 ||0 ||170 ||54||+116 ||3 ||0 ||15
| –
|rowspan=2|
|-
| 2
|align=left|Junior Japan
| 3|| 2||0 ||1||94||97||−3 ||3 ||0 ||11
| –
|- 
|rowspan=2| 2018
|rowspan=2| 9 Marchto17 March
| 1
|align=left bgcolor="#d0ffd0"|Fiji Warriors
| 3 ||3 ||0 ||0 ||118 ||31||+87 ||3 ||0 ||15
| –
|rowspan=2|
|-
| 2
|align=left|Junior Japan
| 3|| 2||0 ||1||77||77||0 ||2 ||0 ||10
| –
|- 
|rowspan=2| 2017
|rowspan=2| 10 Marchto18 March
| 1
|align=left bgcolor="#d0ffd0"|Fiji Warriors
| 3 ||3 ||0 ||0 ||125 ||71||+54 ||2 ||0 ||15
| –
|rowspan=2|
|-
| 2
|align=left|Junior Japan
| 3|| 2||0 ||1||92||103||−11 ||2 ||0 ||10
| –
|-
|rowspan=2| 2016
|rowspan=2| 8 Marchto21 March
| 1
|align=left bgcolor="#d0ffd0"|Fiji Warriors
| 3 ||3 ||0 ||0 ||134||34||+100 ||3 ||0 ||15
|36–0
|rowspan=2|
|-
| 2
|align=left|Samoa A
| 3||2 ||0 ||1||98||56 ||+42 ||2 ||0 ||10
|0–36
|- 
|rowspan=2| 2015
|rowspan=2| 10 Marchto23 March
| 1A
|align=left bgcolor="#d0ffd0"|Pampas XV
| 3 || 3 || 0 || 0 || 89 || 42 || +47 || 2 || 0 || 14
|17–9 
|rowspan=2|
|-
| 1B
|align=left|Fiji Warriors
| 3 || 2 || 0 || 1 || 145 || 42 || +103 || 2 || 1 || 11
|9–17 
|}
{| class="wikitable collapsible collapsed" style="text-align:center; line-height:100%; font-size:100%; width:60%;"
|-
! colspan="4" style="border:0px" |Competition rules
|-
| colspan="4" | Points breakdown:4 points for a win2 points for a draw1 bonus point for a loss by seven points or less1 bonus point for scoring four or more tries in a matchClassification:Teams standings are calculated as follows:Most log points accumulated from all matchesMost log points accumulated in matches between tied teamsHighest difference between points scored for and against accumulated from all matchesMost points scored accumulated from all matches
|}

Pacific Australasian series: 2011 to 2014
Contested by the national 'A' teams of Fiji, Samoa, and Tonga. Japan A joined as a core team in 2013. The core teams played against Super Rugby academy opposition from Australia and New Zealand before meeting each other in a single round robin to decide the title. No finals were played and team finishing on top of the table after all matches were completed was the tournament winner.

In 2014, Argentina's Pampas XV and four Australian Academy sides were added as core teams. Two pools were formed and a single round robin played in each. The top ranked sides in each pool played off in the final for the title and the second ranked teams played off for third place.

{| class="wikitable" style="text-align:center;"
|+  2011–2014 Pacific Rugby Cup finalists.
!rowspan=2|Year
!rowspan=2 style="padding:0 0.75em"|Duration
!rowspan=2|Pos
!rowspan=2 style="padding:0 3.1em"|Team
!colspan=10|Pool matches
!colspan=1|Play-offs
!rowspan=2|Refs
|-

! style="width:20px;"|Pld
! style="width:20px;"|W
! style="width:20px;"|D
! style="width:20px;"|L
! style="width:20px;"|F
! style="width:20px;"|A
! style="width:25px;"|Diff
! style="width:20px;"|TB
! style="width:20px;"|LB
! style="width:20px;"|Pts
! style="padding:0 1em"|Final
|- 
|rowspan=4|2014
|rowspan=4| 21 Februaryto23 March
| 1B
|align=left bgcolor="#d0ffd0"| Pampas XV
| 4 || 4 || 0 || 0 ||148 || 83 ||  65 || 3 || 0 || 19
| 36–21
|rowspan=4|
|-
| 1A
|align=left| Reds A
| 3 || 2 || 0 || 1 ||126 || 55 ||  71 || 2 || 1 || 11
| 21–36
|-
| 2A
|align=left| Fiji Warriors
| 3 || 2 || 0 || 1 ||154 || 59 ||  95 || 2 || 1 || 11
|
|-
| 2B
|align=left| Tonga A
| 4 || 2 || 0 || 2 || 96 ||115 || -19 || 1 || 0 ||  9
|
|-
| style="height:1px" |
|-
|rowspan=4|2013
|rowspan=4| 1 Marchto7 April
| 1
|align=left bgcolor="#d0ffd0"| Fiji Warriors
| 6 || 2 || 2 || 2 || 118 || 155 || -37 || 2 || 0 || 14
|  – 
|rowspan=4|
|-
| 2
|align=left| Samoa A
| 6 || 2 || 0 || 4 || 134 || 198 || -64 || 1 || 1 || 10
| –
|-
| 3
|align=left| Junior Japan
| 6 || 0 || 0 || 6 || 140 || 361 ||-221 || 3 || 0 ||  3
| –
|-
| 4
|align=left| Tonga A
| 6 || 0 || 0 || 6 ||  73 || 306 ||-233 || 0 || 0 ||  0
| –
|-
| style="height:1px" |
|-
|rowspan=3|2012
|rowspan=3| 24 Februaryto19 October
| 1
|align=left bgcolor="#d0ffd0"| Fiji Warriors
| 8 || 7 || 0 || 1 ||205 || 165 || 40 || 3 || 0 || 31
|  – 
|rowspan=3|
|-
| 2
|align=left| Samoa A
| 8 || 3 || 0 || 5 ||191 || 238 ||-47 || 0 || 1 || 13
| –
|-
| 3
|align=left| Tonga A
| 8 || 1 || 1 || 6 || 72 || 253 ||-181 || 0 || 0 || 6
| –
|-
| style="height:1px" |
|-
|rowspan=3|2011
|rowspan=3| 19 Februaryto26 March
| 1
|align=left bgcolor="#d0ffd0"| Fiji Warriors
| 8 || 4 || 0 || 4 || 144 || 201 || -57 || 0 || 1 || 17
|  – 
|rowspan=3|
|-
| 2
|align=left| Samoa A
| 8 || 3 || 0 || 5 || 135 || 171 || -36 || 1 || 2 || 15
| –
|-
| 3
|align=left| Tonga A
| 8 || 2 || 1 || 5 || 133 || 233 ||-100 || 0 || 1 || 11
| –
|}
{| class="wikitable collapsible collapsed" style="text-align:center; line-height:100%; font-size:100%; width:60%;"
|-
! colspan="4" style="border:0px" |Competition rules
|-
| colspan="4" | Points breakdown:4 points for a win2 points for a draw1 bonus point for a loss by seven points or less1 bonus point for scoring four or more tries in a matchClassification:Teams standings are calculated as follows:Most log points accumulated from all matchesMost log points accumulated in matches between tied teamsHighest difference between points scored for and against accumulated from all matchesMost points scored accumulated from all matches
|}

Notes:

Pacific Island tournament: 2006 to 2010

For the first five seasons, the tournament was contested by six teams; two each from Fiji, Samoa, and Tonga. The format consisted of a single round-robin, home or away, and the teams finishing in the first two positions on the table played in a final, hosted by the top ranked team, to decide the Pacific Rugby Cup title.

{| class="wikitable" style="text-align:center;"
|+  2006–2010 Pacific Rugby Cup finalists.
!rowspan=2|Year
!rowspan=2 style="padding:0 0.75em"|Duration
!rowspan=2|Pos
!rowspan=2 style="padding:0 3.1em"|Team
!colspan=9|Pool matches
!colspan=1|Play-offs
!rowspan=2|Refs
|-

! style="width:20px;"|Pld
! style="width:20px;"|W
! style="width:20px;"|D
! style="width:20px;"|L
! style="width:20px;"|PF
! style="width:20px;"|PA
! style="width:25px;"|Diff
! style="width:20px;"|BP
! style="width:20px;"|Pts
! style="padding:0 1em"|Final
|- 
|rowspan=2|2010
|rowspan=2| 5 Mayto29 May
| 1
|align=left bgcolor="#d0ffd0"| Fiji Warriors
|5||4||0||1||155||73||82||3||19
|26–17
|rowspan=2|
|-  
| 2
|align=left| Fiji Barbarians 
|5||4||0||1||145||116||29||3||19
|17–26
|-
| style="height:1px" |
|-
|rowspan=2|2009
|rowspan=2| 24 Aprilto29 May
| 1
|align=left|Upolu Samoa
|5||4||0||1||114||84||30||1||17
|7–19
|rowspan=2|
|- 
| 2
|align=left bgcolor="#d0ffd0"| Fiji Warriors
|5||3||0||2||168||89||79||5||17
|19–7
|-
| style="height:1px" |
|-
|rowspan=2|2008
|rowspan=2| 18 Aprilto24 May
| 1
|align=left| Upolu Samoa
|5||4||0||1||90||49||41||1||17
|3–11
|rowspan=2|
|-
| 2
|align=left bgcolor="#d0ffd0"| Tautahi Gold
|5||3||0||2||97||75||22||1||13
|11–3
|-
| style="height:1px" |
|-
|rowspan=2|2007
|rowspan=2| 31 Marchto5 May
| 1
|align=left| Tau'uta Reds
|5||4||0||1||108||102||6||1||17
|15–35
|rowspan=2|
|-
| 2
|align=left bgcolor="#d0ffd0"| Upolu Samoa
|5||3||0||2||112||114||−2||3||15
|35–15
|-
| style="height:1px" |
|-
|rowspan=2|2006
|rowspan=2|15 Aprilto20 May
| 1
|align=left bgcolor="#d0ffd0"| Savaii Samoa
|5||4||0||1||120||81||39||2||18
|10–5
|rowspan=2|
|-
| 2
|align=left| Fiji Warriors
|5||3||1||1||112||72||40||2||17
|5–10
|}
{| class="wikitable collapsible collapsed" style="text-align:center; line-height:100%; font-size:100%; width:60%;"
|-
! colspan="4" style="border:0px" |Competition rules
|-
| colspan="4" | Points breakdown:4 points for a win2 points for a draw1 bonus point for a loss by seven points or less1 bonus point for scoring four or more tries in a matchClassification:Teams standings are calculated as follows:Most log points accumulated from all matchesMost log points accumulated in matches between tied teamsHighest difference between points scored for and against accumulated from all matchesMost points scored accumulated from all matches
|}

{| class="wikitable"
|+  2006–2010 Overall pool match results.
|-
!width=165|Team
!width=40|Played
!width=40|Won
!width=40|Drawn
!width=40|Lost
!width=40|For
!width=40|Against
!width=40|Diff
!width=40|BP
!width=40|Points
|- align=center
|align=left| Fiji Warriors
| 25 || 13 || 1 || 11 || 598 || 428 || 170|| 14 || 68
|- align=center
|align=left| Savaii Samoa
| 25 || 14 || 0 || 11 || 521 || 451 || 70 || 11 || 67
|- align=center
|align=left| Upolu Samoa
| 25 || 13 || 1 || 11 || 491 || 482 || 9  || 9  || 63
|- align=center
|align=left| Tau'uta Reds 
| 25 || 12 || 1 || 12 || 455 || 438 || 17 || 8  || 58
|- align=center
|align=left| Fiji Barbarians
| 25 || 11 || 1 || 13 || 464 || 592 ||−128|| 12 || 58
|- align=center
|align=left| Tautahi Gold 
| 25 || 10 || 0 || 15 || 425 || 568 ||−143|| 7  || 47
|}

See also
 Pacific Nations Cup

References

External links
 Oceania Rugby official website

 
Pacific Challenge
Pacific Challenge
Rugby union competitions for provincial teams